General Sir Peter William Cradock Hellings,  (6 September 1916 – 2 November 1990) was a Royal Marines officer who served as Commandant General Royal Marines from 1968 to 1971.

Military career
Hellings joined the Royal Marines in 1935 and served in the Second World War as a company commander with 40 Commando, being awarded the Distinguished Service Cross in 1940 and the Military Cross during the fighting in Italy in 1943. He was also mentioned in Despatches in 1946 in recognition of his "gallant and distinguished services in North West Europe" during the closing stages of the war.

Shortly after the end of the war, Hellings commanded 41 Commando and 42 Commando. He saw active service in Malaya in the early 1950s during the Malayan Emergency, and in Cyprus during the Cyprus Emergency, for which he was mentioned in despatches in 1958. He was appointed commanding officer of 40 Commando in 1958, commander of 3 Commando Brigade in 1959 and commander of the Infantry Training Centre Royal Marines in 1960. He went on to be Deputy Director of the Joint Warfare School in 1963, Chief of Staff to the Commandant General Royal Marines in 1964 and Commander Portsmouth Group Royal Marines in 1967. His last appointment was as Commandant General Royal Marines in 1968 before retiring in 1971.

In retirement Hellings became Chairman of the Gas Consumers' Council for the South West, and lived at Milton Combe in Devon.

References

1916 births
1990 deaths
Royal Marines generals
Knights Commander of the Order of the Bath
Recipients of the Distinguished Service Cross (United Kingdom)
Recipients of the Military Cross
British military personnel of the Malayan Emergency
Royal Marines personnel of World War II
British military personnel of the Cyprus Emergency
Military personnel from Surrey